Margaret Hine Forsyth  (28 December 1961 – 4 May 2021) was a New Zealand netball player and coach, and politician. Born in Hamilton, she was selected for the New Zealand national netball team, the Silver Ferns, in 1979 at the age of 17 while a pupil at Hillcrest High School. During the 1980s, Forsyth formed a notable shooting partnership with fellow Silver Ferns shooter Margharet Matenga, known together as the "two Margs". She continued with the team until 1987, competing at three World Netball Tournaments.

Forsyth later became a Hamilton city councillor, and in 2014 was appointed assistant coach of the Waikato Bay of Plenty Magic competing in the ANZ Championship. In 2017 the Magic joined the new ANZ Premiership competition, and Forsyth was promoted to head coach of the team.

In the 2020 New Year Honours, she was appointed an Officer of the New Zealand Order of Merit, for services to netball and the community. 

She died on 4 May 2021, aged 59, shortly after being diagnosed with cancer.

References

1961 births
2021 deaths
New Zealand netball coaches
New Zealand international netball players
Officers of the New Zealand Order of Merit
Netball players at the 1985 World Games
ANZ Premiership coaches
Hamilton City Councillors
Sportspeople from Hamilton, New Zealand
Waikato Bay of Plenty Magic coaches
1979 World Netball Championships players
1983 World Netball Championships players
1987 World Netball Championships players
Deaths from cancer in New Zealand
Northern Mystics coaches